The 2021 KBS Song Festival was the 11th edition of KBS Song Festival, held on December 17, 2021, broadcast by KBS at 8:30 pm KST on the 17th to 12:15 am on the 18th. A total of 20 teams have been invited to the show.

This year, in a situation where K-pop singers and fans could not meet due to Corona 19, the theme is with 'WITH', which means to go forward 'together' with strength.

Background
On November 26, it was announced that Astro's Cha Eun-woo, AOA's Seolhyun and SF9's Rowoon would be hosting this year's festival and the date of the festival will be on December 17.

On December 3, it was revealed that Red Velvet, Oh My Girl, Kang Daniel, The Boyz, Stray Kids, Itzy, TXT, Enhypen, Aespa, and Lee Mu-jin would be part of the first line-up. On December 8, it was announced that Seventeen, Sunmi, NU'EST, Astro, Brave Girls, NCT, SF9, Kim Woo-seok, STAYC, and Ive will be part of the second line-up.

On December 13, KBS released a video featuring several artists dancing and singing a song that encourages everyone to tune in to the festival. The video features TXT's Soobin and Huening Kai, Stray Kids's Felix, Oh My Girl's Hyojung and Arin, NCT's Shotaro, Brave Girls's Minyoung and Eunji, Enhypen's Sunghoon and Ni-ki, Aespa's Ningning, Ive's Wonyoung and Leeseo, SF9's Jaeyoon and Youngbin, Kang Daniel, and STAYC's Seeun and Yoon. The song is a parody of Baby Shark.

Schedule

Presenters
 The Beginning
 Backstage – Oh My Girl's Arin, TXT's Choi Soo-bin, Ive's Jang Won-young and Enhypen's Sunghoon
 Main Event – Astro's Cha Eun-woo, AOA's Seolhyun,  and SF9's Rowoon

Performers
The following individuals and groups, listed in order of appearance or performed musical numbers.

References

External links
 

Annual television shows
KBS Song Festival